Guillaume le Heurteur (also found under the form Guillaume Heurteur and Guillaume Hurteur) was a French composer of the Renaissance about whom very little is known.

Life 
Also a canon and preceptor of the choirboys of the Collegiate church Basilica of Saint Martin, Tours as evidenced by the title page of a collection of motets published in the same year, Le Heurteur was the author of four masses, two Magnificats, twenty-one motets and twenty-three songs, published between 1530 and 1549, mainly by Pierre Attaingnant, printer in Paris.

Sources and biography 
Very little information is available on Guillaume le Heurteur.

References

Bibliography

External links 
 
 
 Guillaume le Heurteur on IdRef
 Guillaume le Heurteur on MusicBrainz
 Le Heurteur, Guillaume on WorldCat
 Mirelaridon - Guillaume le Heurteur (fl.1530-1545) on YouTube

Renaissance composers
French composers of sacred music
Canons (priests)
16th-century French composers